Megachile pollinosa is a species of bee in the family Megachilidae. It was described by Spinola in 1851.

References

Pollinosa
Insects described in 1851